The Glen Alpine Springs trailhead or Glen Alpine trailhead is located off Highway 89 a few miles north of South Lake Tahoe, California, at Fallen Leaf Lake just to the west of Lake Tahoe. The road to the trailhead is not plowed in winter.

Some of the destinations most accessed by the trailhead are Susie Lake (five miles) and Grass Lake (two miles), as well as the rest of the Desolation Wilderness.

External links 
USDA Forest Service Trailhead Information

Lake Tahoe
Sierra Nevada (United States)
Protected areas of El Dorado County, California
Transportation in El Dorado County, California
Eldorado National Forest